The 19th edition of the annual Hypo-Meeting took place on 29 and 30 May 1993 in Götzis, Austria. The track and field competition featured a decathlon (men) and a heptathlon (women) event.

Men's Decathlon

Schedule

29 May

30 May

Records

Results

Women's Heptathlon

Schedule

29 May

30 May

Records

Notes

See also
1993 World Championships in Athletics – Men's decathlon
1993 World Championships in Athletics – Women's heptathlon

References
 decathlon2000
 decathlonfans
 1993 Year Ranking Decathlon

1993
Hypo-Meeting
Hypo-Meeting